The First Congregational Church is located at 33 East Forest Avenue (on the corner of Forest and Woodward Avenue) in Midtown Detroit, Michigan. It was designated a Michigan State Historic Site in 1974 and listed on the National Register of Historic Places in 1979.

History
The First Congregational Church of Detroit was established on December 25, 1844. Two church buildings were built near the Detroit River. The third building was constructed at the present site in 1891, and was designed by architect John Lyman Faxon. An addition to the church, known as the Angel's Wing, was constructed in 1921 by Albert Kahn.

Gaius Glenn Atkins served twice as minister of the church in the early 20th century.

Architecture
The church is designed in a blend of the Romanesque and Byzantine styles, using rough-hewn, warm red limestone. The Woodward facade has a five-bay loggia, with a parapeted front gable. Above that are rounded windows with tracery framed by a rounded arch. The church also features a 120-foot campanile with many narrow arcades. The church is topped by an 8-foot copper figure of the Archangel Uriel.

The church is patterned after churches found in Venice and Ravenna. The sanctuary, which resembles the lower church of St. Francis of Assisi, boasts carved wood, ceiling portraits, rose windows and sumptuous colors. The interior murals were designed and executed by Lyle Durgin, completed in December, 1891.

Living Museum
The church offers exhibits about the historical and architectural aspects of the church, its buildings and activities. Visitors can go on self-guided tours of the historic facilities and buildings.

The church also hosts the Underground Railroad Living Museum, a storytelling simulation of the original Underground Railroad.

Gallery

References

Bibliography

External links
Official First Congregational Church website
Underground Railroad Living Museum

Churches in Detroit
Congregational churches in Michigan
Midtown Detroit
Woodward Avenue
History museums in Michigan
Museums in Detroit
Religious museums in Michigan
Churches completed in 1891
19th-century churches in the United States
Churches on the National Register of Historic Places in Michigan
Michigan State Historic Sites in Wayne County, Michigan
National Register of Historic Places in Detroit
Historic district contributing properties in Michigan
Religious organizations established in 1844
1844 establishments in Michigan
Congregational organizations established in the 19th century
19th-century Protestant churches
Churches on the Underground Railroad
Uriel